Mayer E. Twersky (born October 17, 1960) is an Orthodox rabbi and one of the roshei yeshiva at the Rabbi Isaac Elchanan Theological Seminary (RIETS) of Yeshiva University. He holds the Leib Merkin Distinguished Professorial Chair in Talmud and Jewish Philosophy. His popular lectures emphasize a combination of conceptual analyses and ethical imperatives.

Twersky hails from the well-known chassidic family of Chernobyl. He is the younger son of Isadore Twersky. His brother, Moshe Twersky, was murdered in the 2014 Jerusalem synagogue massacre. He is a 5th cousin of Rabbi Abraham J. Twerski. Other cousins include the Grand Rabbis of Chernobyl, and many people with the last name of Twersky or Twerski. He is also a grandson of Rabbi Joseph B. Soloveitchik.

Twersky attended the Maimonides School, which his grandfather founded, through high school. He then attended Harvard College, while studying Talmud privately with his grandfather. Following college, he studied for rabbinic ordination at RIETS. He eventually became a teacher in the Yeshiva University High School for Boys and later a lecturer in RIETS.

In addition to Hebrew articles in RIETS's annual Torah journal, Twersky has published three English articles in the journal Tradition and an English article in the Orthodox Union's magazine Jewish Action. Two of these four articles relate to the place of women in contemporary Orthodox Judaism.

Twersky currently holds the position of Grand Rabbi of the Talne Hasidim.
The current shamash of the Rebbe is Yair Caplan of Edison, New Jersey. Caplan spent two years studying in Yeshivat Kerem B'Yavneh (located in Kvutzat Yavne, Israel) before coming to Yeshiva University and serving as the Rebbe's shamash. Past shamashim include Jonah Steinmetz, Etan Schnall, Yitzi Genack and Yosef Schwartz.

Twersky is currently on the board of TorahWeb, which frequently publishes short English articles of his. He also lectures frequently to synagogue congregants.

References

Online Speeches
TorahWeb.org Audio
TorahWeb.org Video
YU Torah
 Leib Merkin Distinguished Professorial Chair in Talmud and Jewish Philosophy

Online Articles
TorahWeb.org Articles
Torah Perspectives on Women's Issues
Halakhic Values and Halakhic Decisions: Rav Soloveitchik’s Pesak Regarding Women’s Prayer Groups
Rabbi Gil Student's defense of Rabbi Twersky's article

1960 births
Living people
Harvard College alumni
American Orthodox rabbis
Rabbi Isaac Elchanan Theological Seminary semikhah recipients
Yeshiva University rosh yeshivas
20th-century American rabbis
21st-century American rabbis
Hasidic rebbes